Karnali Province is one of the seven federal provinces of Nepal. The province occupies 15% of the Nepal landmass in the size and also holds one of the richest genetic biodiversity in the country. National Park and Protected Areas covered the largest part of Karnali Province. It has climatic diversity ranging from the tropical to permanent snow.

This is a district wise list of natural monuments in Karnali Province, Nepal as officially recognized by and available through the website of the Ministry of Culture, Tourism and Civil Aviation, Ministry of Forests and Environment and District coordination committee, Nepal.

Dailekh District

|}

Dolpa District 

|}

 Eastern Rukum District

Humla District

|}

Jajarkot District
Nadai Daab, Chalna Daab, Sai Kuwari lek are the natural monuments in Jajarkot.

Jumla District

|}

Kalikot District

|}

Mugu District

|}

Salyan District

Surkhet District

|}

Western Rukum District

|}

See also 
 List of Natural Monuments in Nepal

References

External links

Natural Monuments of Nepal
Natural monuments, Karnali
Natural monuments
Tourist attractions in Karnali Province